Callirrhoe (also Callirhoe) may refer to:
 Callirhoe (mythology), several figures in Greek mythology, including:
 Callirrhoe (Oceanid), daughter of Oceanus and Tethys
 Callirrhoe (daughter of Achelous)
 Callirrhoe (Jordan), site of baths near Zareth-shahar on the eastern shore of the Dead Sea
 Callirrhoe (moon), a moon of Jupiter
 Callirhoe (novel), written by the ancient Greek author Chariton
 Callirhoe (plant), a genus of plant within the family Malvaceae
 Callirhoé, an opera by the French composer André Cardinal Destouches, first performed on December 27, 1712
 Callirhoé, the only ballet written by French composer Cécile Chaminade